Live & Unplugged is an acoustic EP by Australian band Sick Puppies. "Odd One", "So What I Lied", and "The Pretender" were recorded in a studio, while "You're Going Down" was recorded live. This EP was sold via digital stores while physical copies were available during Record Store Day. The album is currently no longer available on iTunes.

Track listing
"Odd One (Acoustic)" – 3:32
"So What I Lied (Acoustic)" – 3:12
"The Pretender (Acoustic)" – 3:01
"You're Going Down (Acoustic) (Live)" – 2:47

Personnel
Sick Puppies
 Shim Moore – lead vocals, lead guitar
 Emma Anzai – bass, backing vocals
 Mark Goodwin – drums

Production
 Tim James – producer
 Antonina Armato – producer
 Paul Palmer – mixing, A&R
 Kim Stephens – A&R
 Brad Blackwoord – mastering
 Paul Stepanek – management

Artwork
 Mike Joyce – design
 Travis Shinn – photography

References

2010 EPs
2010 live albums
Sick Puppies albums
Virgin Records live albums
Virgin Records EPs
Record Store Day releases